Anna Acton (born 29 January 1977) is an English actress who is best known for her roles as Rochelle Barratt, the wife of a borough commander, in the ITV television series The Bill, and DC Emma Summerhayes in the BBC One soap opera EastEnders.

Career
Prior to appearing in The Bill, Acton played the long-suffering yet bubbly Geri Evans in the soap opera Family Affairs for three and a half years.

Acton also appeared in two episodes of Doctors as Rachel Cook (April 2006) and later as Keira Chesterton (February 2008) and Hollyoaks (October 2006) as DC Mullins. In May 2007, she starred as Louise Martin in two episodes of HolbyBlue for the BBC. In August 2008 she appeared with Paul Nicholls in Harley Street (ITV) and was also seen as Dorothy in the CGI Sketch Show for BBC The Wrong Door.

From 2013 to 2015, Acton played the role of Joy in the CBeebies programme Topsy and Tim. From 21 April 2014 to 2 January 2015, she portrayed DC Emma Summerhayes, the police officer investigating Lucy Beale's (Hetti Bywater) murder, in the BBC One soap opera EastEnders.

From 2015 to 2016, Acton appeared in the BBC One medical soap Casualty as Nikki Chisom. In 2018, she appeared in Birches, a UK-based feature based on the novel Silver Birches published in 2009 by Adrian Plass. Birches was turned into a film directed by Randall Stevens, with screenplay by Mark Freiburger. It starred Natasha Little and Todd Carty. In May 2021, she appeared in an episode of the BBC soap opera Doctors as Vicki.

In 2022, Acton appeared in an advertisement for No7.

Personal life
Acton is married to actor and former Family Affairs co-star Ben Hull. The couple reside in Buckinghamshire and have two daughters, Grace and Lana.

Filmography

Film

Television

Theatre credits

Awards and nominations

References

External links

1977 births
Living people
English stage actresses
English television actresses
English soap opera actresses
English film actresses
English voice actresses
People from Marlow, Buckinghamshire